Field hockey at the 2014 Asian Games was held in Incheon, South Korea from 20 September to 2 October 2014.

The winners of the tournament qualified as Asian representatives to the 2016 Summer Olympics.

Medal summary

Medal table

Medalists

Qualification
Top 6 Asian teams, South Korea, India, Pakistan, Japan, China and Malaysia could enter the men's competition directly. For the next six spots a qualification tournament was held in Dhaka, Bangladesh from 15 to 23 March 2014.

Women's qualification tournament was held in Bangkok, Thailand from 15 to 23 February 2014. All four teams qualified for the Asian Games but later Chinese Taipei withdrew from both tournaments, Iran also pulled out from the men's competition.

Men

Women

Draw
The teams were distributed according to their position at the FIH World Rankings using the serpentine system for their distribution.

Men

Pool A
 (8)
 (13)
 (14)
 (30)
 (36)

Pool B
 (9)
 (11)
 (22)
 (27)
 (40)

Women

Pool A
 (5)
 (13)
 (21)
 (53)

Pool B
 (9)
 (10)
 (33)
 (40)

Final standing

Men

Women

References

 
2014 Asian Games events
2014
Asian Games
2014 Asian Games